Poropuntius hathe is a species of ray-finned fish in the genus Poropuntius. It is a poorly known species and it is thought to be restricted to tributaries of the lower Salween basin in western Thailand and eastern Myanmar.

References 

hathe
Fish described in 1998